Egypt has a long and involved demographic history. This is partly due to the territory's geographical location at the crossroads of several major cultural areas: North Africa, the Middle East, the Mediterranean and Sub-Saharan Africa. In addition, Egypt has experienced several invasions during its long history, including by the Canaanites, the Ancient Libyans, the Assyrians, the Kushites (a Nubian civilization), the Persians, the Greeks, the Romans, and the Arabs.

Neolithic and Predynastic periods

Around 8000 BCE, the Sahara had a wet phase, the Neolithic Subpluvial (Holocene Wet Phase). There is very little evidence of human occupation of the Egyptian Nile Valley during the Early and Middle Holocene periods. This may be due to problems in site preservation. The Middle Nile Valley (Nubia) had population settlements attested by occupational sequence since the Pleistocene and the Holocene. People from the surrounding areas moved into the Sahara, and evidence suggests that the populations of the Nile Valley reduced in size. Several scholars have argued that the African origins of the Egyptian civilisation derived from pastoral communities which emerged in both the Egyptian and northern Sudanese regions of the Nile Valley in the 5th millennium BCE.

Predynastic Egypt is conventionally said to begin about 6000 BCE. Between 5300 and 3500 BCE. the wet phase declined and increasing aridity pushed the Saharan peoples into locations with reliable water, such as oases and the Nile Valley. The mid-Holocene droughts drove refuges from the Southern Levant and the Eastern Sahara into Egypt, where they mixed and settled.

From around 4800 to 4300 BCE, the Merimde culture, known from the typesite Merimde Beni-Salame, flourished in Lower Egypt. Later, Lower Egypt was also the home of the Buto Maadi culture, best known from the site at Maadi near Cairo. In Upper Egypt, the predynastic Badari culture was followed by the Naqada culture (Amratian).

Around 3000 BCE, the wet phase of the Sahara came to an end. The Saharan populations retreated to the south towards the Sahel, and east in the direction of the Nile Valley. It was these populations, in addition to Neolithic farmers from the Near East, that likely played a role in the formation of the Egyptian state as they brought their food crops, sheep, goats, and cattle to the Nile Valley.

Material culture and Archaeological data

Located in the extreme north-east corner of Africa, ancient Egyptian society was at a crossroads between the African and Near Eastern regions. Early Egyptologists noted the increased novelty and seemingly rapid change in Predynastic pottery and noted trade contacts between ancient Egypt and the Middle East. Fekri Hassan and Edwin et al. point to mutual influence from both inner Africa as well as the Levant.Similar cultural features have been observed between the early Saharan populations and dynastic Egypt such as pottery, iconography and mummification.

The culture of Merimde in Lower Egypt, among others, has been linked to the Levant. The pottery of the Buto Maadi culture, best known from the site at Maadi near Cairo, also shows connections with the southern Levant. In Upper Egypt, the predynastic Badari culture was followed by the Naqada culture (Amratian). These groups have been described to be culturally related to the Nubian and Northeastern African populations. Upper Egypt is considered to have formed the pre-dominant basis for the cultural development of Pharaonic Egypt and the Proto-dynastic kings emerged from the Naqada region.Several dynasties of southern or Upper Egyptian origin, which included the 11th, 12th, 17th, 18th and 25th dynasties, reunified and reinvigorated pharaonic Egypt after periods of fragmentation.

Frank Yurco in 1989 expressed the view that among foreign populations, Nubians were closest ethnically to the Egyptians, shared the same culture in the predynastic period, and used the same pharaonic political structure. Yurco noted that some Middle Kingdom rulers, particularly some pharaohs of the Twelfth Dynasty, had strong Nubian features due to the origin of the dynasty in the Aswan region of southern Egypt. He also identifies the pharaoh Seqenenre Tao of the Seventeenth Dynasty, as having Nubian features. In 1996 he said that "the peoples of Egypt, the Sudan, and much of North-East Africa are generally regarded as a Nilotic continuity, with widely ranging physical features (complexions light to dark, various hair and craniofacial types)", further arguing that Egypt's "current population [is] largely representative of the ancient inhabitants” .

The discoveries made at a cemetery at Qustul in Nubia lead Bruce Williams to suggest in 1980 the possibility that Egypt’s monarchy originated near Qustul in Nubia. This theory has been directly contradicted by more recent discoveries at Abydos in Upper Egypt which prove that the Egyptian monarchy predates the tombs at Qustul. The archaeological cemeteries at Qustul are no longer available for excavations since the flooding of Lake Nasser.

Focusing on the A-Group culture (3500–2800 BCE), Michinori asserted in 2000 that external influence from Nubia on the formation of Ancient Egypt in the pre-dynastic period to the dynasty period predates influence from eastern Mesopotamia. According to him, chiefs of the same cultural level as Upper Egyptian powers existed in Lower Nubia and exhibited pharaonic iconography before the unification of Egypt.

Christopher Ehret (1996) argued that the evidence of language and culture had shown Ancient Egypt was rooted in an African context and "the origins of Egyptian ethnicity lay in the areas south of Egypt".

Joseph Vogel (1997) stated "The period when sub-Saharan Africa was most influential in Egypt was a time when neither Egypt, as we understand it culturally, nor the Sahara, as we understand it geographically, existed. Populations and cultures now found south of the desert roamed far to the north. The culture of Upper Egypt, which became dynastic Egyptian civilization, could fairly be called a Sudanese transplant."

Excavations from Nabta Playa, located in Nubia about 100 km west of Abu Simbel, suggest that the Neolithic inhabitants of the region were migrants from Sub-Saharan Africa. There is some speculation that this culture is likely to have been the predecessor of the Egyptians, based on cultural similarities and social complexity which is thought to be reflective of the Old Kingdom of Egypt. 
In addition, there is evidence that sheep and goats were introduced into the Nabta Playa from Western Asia about 8,000 years ago.

Stuart Tyson Smith (2001) described evidence which showed that the Ancient Egyptian culture shared strong affinities with modern African cultural practices such as divine kingship, the use of head rests along with circumcision and that the archaeological evidence also "strongly supports an African origin" for the ancient Egyptians. In 2018, Smith reviewed evidence which indicated linkages between the Upper Egyptian region, the Sahara and the Sudanese Nubia. In particular, he argued that the cultural features which characterised the Egyptian civilisation were "widely distributed in north-eastern Africa but not in western Asia" and this had earlier origins in the Saharan wet phase period.

Toby A. H. Wilkinson (2000) writes that in the elite art of the late Predynastic Period, the use of Mesopotamian iconography is well-known.  He mentions in particular the intertwined serpopards and the rosettes on the Narmer Palette and the Narmer mace-head. After the reign of Narmer, indigenous Egyptian motifs were preferred.
Toby Wilkinson in 2002 proposed an origin for the Egyptians somewhere in the Eastern Desert, and presented evidence that much of predynastic Egypt was representative of the traditional African cattle-culture, typical of Southern Sudanese and East African pastoralists of today. Toby Wilkinson has cited the iconography on rock art in the Eastern Desert region as depicting what he interpreted to be among the earliest representations of the royal crowns and suggested the Red Crown could have originated in the southern Nile Valley.

Donald B. Redford wrote in 2004 that it is reasonable to assume that the Seventeenth Dynasty originated in Nubia based on the expanded presence of Nubians in Egypt during that time period. The Seventeenth Dynasty conducted a succession of military campaigns against Avaris in Lower Egypt and also Kerma in Nubia, resulting eventually in the collapse of Kerma and its occupation. In the eighth century BCE Kush considered itself the sole custodian and proponent of the unadulterated Egyptian tradition.

Maria Gatto also wrote in 2014 that archaeological research in the Aswan area has revealed that the process of cultural mixing in the boundary region of the First Cataract of the Nile River during the fourth millennium BCE, which is clearly detectable in the cultural material, was much more complex than previously thought. In the first half of the fourth millennium BCE the rise of the Naqada culture gave rise to a distinction between an Egyptian and a Nubian identity. Before then the Tarifian, Badarian and Tasian cultures of Middle and Upper Egypt were strongly similar to the Nubian/Nilotic pastoral tradition. The earliest evidence of the Naqada culture comes from the area of Abydos, and then it spread south into Nubia, and north across Egypt. The author also noted that the cultural substratum in Upper Egypt was mostly Nubian-related.

Stan Hendrick, John Coleman Darnell and Maria Gatto in 2012 excavated petroglyphic engravings from Nag el-Hamdulab to the north of Aswan, in southern Egypt, which featured representations of a boat procession, solar symbolism and the earliest known depiction of the White Crown with an estimated dating range between 3200 BCE and 3100 BCE.

Deitrich Wildung (2018) examined Eastern Saharan pottery styles and Sudanese stone sculptures and suggested these artefacts were transmitted across the Nile Valley and influenced the pre-dynastic Egyptian culture in the Neolithic period. Wildung, in a separate publication, has argued that Nubian features were common in Egyptian iconography since the pre-dynastic era and that the early dynastic pharaohs such as Khufu were represented with these Nubian features.

DNA studies

Contamination from handling and intrusion from microbes create obstacles to the recovery of ancient DNA. Consequently, most DNA studies have been carried out on modern Egyptian populations with the intent of learning about the influences of historical migrations on the population of Egypt. S.O.Y. Keita, a biological anthropologist, has argued that some genetic studies have a "default racialist or racist approach" and should be interpreted in a framework with other sources of evidence.

A study published in 2017 described the extraction and analysis of DNA from 151 mummified ancient Egyptian individuals, whose remains were recovered from Abusir el-Meleq in Middle Egypt. The scientists said that obtaining well-preserved, uncontaminated DNA from mummies has been a problem for the field and that these samples provided "the first reliable data set obtained from ancient Egyptians using high-throughput DNA sequencing methods". The specimens represented a period stretching from the late New Kingdom to the Roman era (1388 BCE–426 CE). Complete mitochondrial DNA (mtDNA) sequences were obtained for 90 of the mummies and were compared with each other and with several other ancient and modern datasets. The scientists found that the ancient Egyptian individuals in their own dataset possessed highly similar mitochondrial profiles throughout the examined period. Modern Egyptians generally shared this maternal haplogroup pattern, but also carried more African clades. However, analysis of the mummies' mtDNA haplogroups found that they shared greater mitochondrial affinities with modern populations from the Near East and the Levant compared to modern Egyptians. Additionally, three of the ancient Egyptian individuals were analysed for Y-DNA, and were observed to bear paternal lineages that are common in both the Middle East and North Africa. The researchers cautioned that the affinities of the examined ancient Egyptian specimens may not be representative of those of all ancient Egyptians since they were from a single archaeological site. Wolfgang Haak, group leader at the Max Planck Institute for the Science of Human History in Jena noted that, “the genetics of the Abusir el-Meleq community did not undergo any major shifts during the 1,300 year timespan we studied, suggesting that the population remained genetically relatively unaffected by foreign conquest and rule."

Gourdine et al criticised the methodology of the Scheunemann et al study and argued that the Sub-Saharan "genetic affinities" may be attributed to "early settlers" and "the relevant Sub-Saharan genetic markers" do not correspond with the geography of known trade routes".

In 2022, Danielle Candelora noted several limitations with the 2017 Scheunemann et al study such as its “untested sampling methods, small sample size and problematic comparative data” which she argued had been misused to legitimise racist conceptions of Ancient Egypt with “scientific evidence”.

A follow-up study by Scheunemann et al.(2022) was carried out collecting samples from six excavation sites along the entire length of the Nile vally spanning 4000 years of Egyptian history. Samples from 17 mummies and 14 skeletal remains were collected, and high quality mitochondrial genomes were reconstructed from 10 individuals. The analyzed mitochondrial genomes matched the results from the earlier study at Abusir el-Meleq.

A 2020 DNA study by Gad, Hawass et al, analysed mitochondrial and Y-chromosomal haplogroups from Tutankhamun’s family members of the 18th Dynasty, using comprehensive control procedures to ensure quality results. They found that the Y-chromosome haplogroup of the family was R1b, which originates in West Asia and which today makes up 50–60% of the genetic pool of modern Europeans. The mitochondrial haplogroup was K, which is most likely also part of a Near Eastern lineage. Because the profiles for Tutankhamun and Amenhotep III were incomplete, the analysis produced differing probability figures despite having concordant allele results. Because the relationships of these two mummies with the KV55 mummy had previously been confirmed in an earlier study, the haplogroup prediction of both mummies could be derived from the full profile of the KV55 data. However, the specific clade of R1b was not determined. Other findings showed the Y-chromosomal halogroup for the Yuya mummy, and the mitochondrial haplogroup H2b, both also indicating West Asian and Near Eastern lineages for Tutankhamun's family members. The study referenced an older one showing the 20th Dynasty pair of Ramesses III and his son were found to have the haplogroup E1b1a based on 13 STRs using Whit Athey's Haplogroup Predictor, which has its highest frequencies in modern populations from West Africa and Central Africa, but which is rare among North Africans and nearly absent in East Africa.

In 2010 Hawass et al undertook detailed anthropological, radiological, and genetic studies as part of the King Tutankhamun Family Project. The objectives included attempting to determine familial relationships among 11 royal mummies of the New Kingdom, as well to research for pathological features including potential inherited disorders and infectious diseases. In 2012, Hawass et al undertook an anthropological, forensic, radiological, and genetic study of the 20th dynasty mummies of Ramesses III and an unknown man which were found together. In 2022, S.O.Y. Keita analysed 8 Short Tandem loci (STR) data published as part of these studies by Hawass et al, using an algorithm that only has three choices: Eurasians, sub-Saharan Africans, and East Asians. Using these three options, Keita concluded that the studies showed "a majority to have an affinity with "sub-Saharan" Africans in one affinity analysis". However, Keita cautioned that this does not mean that the royal mummies “lacked other affiliations” which he argued had been obscured in typological thinking. Keita further added that different “data and algorithms might give different results” which reflects the complexity of biological heritage and the associated interpretation.

Biological anthropometric indicators

Craniofacial criteria

The use of craniofacial criteria as reliable indicators of population grouping or ethnicity has been a longstanding focus of biological anthropology. In 1912, Franz Boas argued that cranial shape was heavily influenced by environmental factors and could change within a few generations under differing conditions, thereby making the cephalic index an unreliable indicator of inherited influences such as ethnicity. Gravlee, Bernard and Leonard (2003), Beals, Smith, and Dodd (1984) and Williams and Armelagos (2005) similarly posited that "race" and cranial variation had low correlations, and proposed that cranial variation was instead strongly correlated with climate variables.

Brace (1993) differentiated adaptive cranial traits from non-adaptive cranial traits, asserting that only the non-adaptive cranial traits served as reliable indicators of genetic relatedness between populations. This was further corroborated in studies by von Cramon-Taubadel (2008, 2009a, 2011). Clement and Ranson (1998) claimed that cranial analysis yields a 77%-95% rate of accuracy in determining the racial origins of human skeletal remains. However, the traits are not clear until puberty, racial determination of preadolescent skulls is much more difficult.
A craniofacial study by C. Loring Brace et al. (1993) concluded that the Predynastic Egyptians of Upper Egypt and the Late Dynastic Egyptians of Lower Egypt were most closely related to each other. They also showed general ties with other Afro-Asiatic-speaking populations in North Africa, Neolithic and modern Europeans, and Indian people, but not at all with populations of sub-Saharan Africa, Eastern Asia, Oceania, or the Americas. Joseph Deniker and other early anthropologists similarly noted that the overall cranial form of Ethiopid, Near Eastern Semitic and Berber ethnic groups, all of whom speak Hamito-Semitic languages, are largely the same. In 2007, Strouhal et al described the physical features of ancient A-Group Nubians as "Caucasoid" which were "not distinguishable from the contemporary Predynastic Upper Egyptians of the Badarian and Nagadian cultures" based in reference to previous anthropological studies from 1975 and 1985.

In 1996, Lovell and Prowse reported the presence of individuals buried at Naqada in what they interpreted to be elite, high status tombs, showing them to be an endogamous ruling or elite segment who were significantly different from individuals buried in two other, apparently nonelite cemeteries, and more closely related morphologically to populations in Northern Nubia than those in Southern Egypt. Nancy Lovell wrote in 1999 that studies of skeletal remains indicate that the physical characteristics of ancient southern Egyptians and Nubians were "within the range of variation" for both ancient and modern indigenous peoples of the Sahara and tropical Africa, and that the distribution of population characteristics "seems to follow a clinal pattern from south to north", which may be explained by natural selection as well as gene flow between neighboring populations. She also wrote that the archaeological and inscriptional evidence for contact between Egypt and Syro-Palestine "suggests that gene flow between these areas was very likely," and that the early Nile Valley populations were "part of an African lineage, but exhibiting local variation".

This view was also shared by the late Egyptologist Frank Yurco.

Egyptologist Barry Kemp (2005) has reviewed the available skulls and skeletal evidence on the ancient Egyptians. He observes that skeletons from earlier periods, which would help elucidate the origin of the Predynastic Egyptians, are rare, and that the amount of samples available for study are "microscopically small". Kemp states that it is dangerous to take one set of skeletons and use them to characterize the population of the whole of Egypt, because there is no single ancient Egyptian population to study, but rather a diversity of local populations. Specifically, he criticises the methodology of skewed databases such as the CRANID software and states "If, on the other hand, CRANID had used one of the Elephantine populations of the same period, the geographic association would be much more with the African groups to the south". He notes also that Predynastic skulls from Upper Egypt appear to be noticeably different in their measurements from an Old Kingdom group from tombs around the pyramids of Giza. Kemp cautions that the features of individuals within a population can be expected to display a degree of variation which can be quite wide and which may overlap with that present in a different population, and that characteristics change over time. Kemp asserts that modern Egyptians would therefore be the most logical and closest approximation to the ancient Egyptians.

Sonia Zakrzewski in 2007 noted that population continuity occurs over the Egyptian Predynastic into the Greco-Roman periods, and that a relatively high level of genetic differentiation was sustained over this time period. She concluded therefore that the process of state formation itself may have been mainly an indigenous process, but that it may have occurred in association with in-migration, particularly during the Early Dynastic and Old Kingdom periods.

A 1992 study conducted by S.O.Y. Keita on First Dynasty crania from the royal tombs in Abydos, noted the predominant pattern was "Southern" or a “tropical African variant” (though others were also observed), which had affinities with Kerma Kushites. The general results demonstrate greater affinity with Upper Nile Valley groups, but also suggest clear change from earlier craniometric trends. The gene flow and movement of northern officials to the important southern city may explain the findings. In 2005, Keita examined Badarian crania from predynastic upper Egypt in comparison to various European and tropical African crania. He found that the predynastic Badarian series clustered much closer with the tropical African series. The  comparative samples were selected based on "Brace et al.’s (1993) comments on the affinities of an upper Egyptian/Nubian epipalaeolithic series".
In 2008, Keita found the early predynastic groups in Southern Egypt which included Badarian skeletal samples, were similar to Nile-Valley remains from areas to the south and north of Upper Egypt. Overall, the dynastic Egyptians (includes both Upper and Lower Egyptians) showed much closer affinities with these particular Northeast African populations. In his comparison to the various Egyptian series, Greeks, Somali/Horn, and Italians were used. He also concluded that more material was needed to make a firm conclusion about the relationship between the early Holocene Nile valley populations and later ancient Egyptians.

In 2013, Terrazas et al. conducted a comparative craniometric analysis of paleolithic to modern crania from different parts of the continent. The purpose of the research, was to test certain hypothesis about the possible origins and evolution of the earliest people in Africa. In it, the dynastic Egyptian skulls were morphologically closest to Afroasiatic-speaking populations from the Horn region. Both of these fossil series possessed notable Middle Eastern affinities and were distinct from the analyzed prehistoric crania of North Africa and the Horn of Africa, including the Pleistocene Rabat skull, Herto Homo sapiens idaltu fossil and Early Holocene Kef Oum Touiza skeleton. The scientists suggest this may indicate that the Afroasiatic-speaking groups settled in the area during a later epoch, having possibly arrived from the Middle East. People in Northern and Eastern Africa would have been the result of local people and immigrants from Asia.

In 2020, Godde analysed a series of crania, including two Egyptian (predynastic Badarian and Nagada series), a series of A-Group Nubians and a Bronze Age series from Lachish, Palestine. The two pre-dynastic series had strongest affinities, followed by closeness between the Nagada and the Nubian series. Further, the Nubian A-Group plotted nearer to the Egyptians and the Lachish sample placed more closely to Naqada than Badari. According to Godde the spatial-temporal model applied to the pattern of biological distances explains the more distant relationship of Badari to Lachish than Naqada to Lachish as gene flow will cause populations to become more similar over time.

Modern Egyptians
Patricia Smith, in her entry noted that "the biological characteristics of modern Egyptians show a north-south cline, reflecting their geographic location between sub-Saharan Africa and the Levant. This is expressed in DNA, blood groups, serum proteins and genetic disorders (Filon 1996; Hammer et al. 1998; Krings et al. 1999). They can also be expressed in phenotypic characteristics that can be identified in teeth and bones (Crichton 1966; Froment 1992; Keita 1996). These characteristics include head form, facial and nasal characteristics, jaw relationships, tooth size, morphology and upper/lower limb proportions. In all these features, Modern Egyptians resemble Sub-Saharan Africans (Howells 1989, Keita 1995)."

Gad et al (2020) described recent studies which were conducted on modern Egyptian samples had produced predominantly European or west Eurasian haplogroups.

Sereological evidence

Blood typing on ancient Egyptian mummies is scant. A study published in 1982 found that blood typing of dynastic mummies found ABO frequencies to be most similar to primarily modern Egyptians, and some also to Northern Haratin populations. ABO blood group distribution shows that the Egyptians form a sister group to North African populations including Berbers, Nubians and Canary Islanders.

Limb ratios
Trikhanus (1981) found Egyptians to plot closest to tropical Africans and not Mediterranean Europeans residing in a roughly similar climatic area.

Robins and Shute (1983) performed X-ray measurements on the physical proportions of ancient Egyptian pharaohs from the 18th and 19th dynasties such as Thutmose III, Amenhotep III, Tutankhamun, Seti I and Rameses II. The authors reported that the limbs of the pharaohs, like those of other Ancient Egyptians, had "negroid characteristics", in that the distal segments were relatively long in comparison with the proximal segments. An exception was Ramesses II, who appears to have had short legs below the knees. According to Robins and Shute (1986) the average limb elongation ratios among pre-dynastic ancient Egyptians is higher than that of modern West Africans who reside much closer to the equator. Robins and Shute therefore term these ancient Egyptians to be "super-negroid" but state that although the body plans of the ancient Egyptians were closer to those of modern negroes than for modern whites, "this does not mean that the ancient Egyptians were negroes".

Anthropologist S.O.Y. Keita (1993) criticized Robins and Shute, stating they do not interpret their results within an adaptive context, and stating that they imply "misleadingly" that early southern Egyptians were not a "part of the Saharo-tropical group, which included Negroes".

Anthropologist C. Loring Brace (1993) points out that limb elongation is "clearly related to the dissipation of metabolically generated heat" in areas of higher ambient temperature. He also stated that "skin color intensification and distal limb elongation is apparent wherever people have been long-term residents of the tropics". He also points out that the term "super negroid" is inappropriate, as it is also applied to non-negroid populations. These features have been observed among Egyptian samples.

Zakrzewski (2003) studied skeletal samples from the Badarian period to the Middle Kingdom in Upper Egypt. Her raw data suggested that the Ancient Egyptians in general had "tropical body plans" but that their proportions were actually "super-negroid", i.e. the limb indices are relatively longer than in many "African" populations. She proposed that the apparent development of an increasingly African body plan over time may also be due to Nubian mercenaries being included in the Middle Kingdom sample. Although, she noted that inspite of the differences in tibae lengths among the Badarian and Early Dynastic samples, that "all samples lie relatively clustered together as compared to the other populations". Zakrzewski concluded that the "results must remain provisional due to the relatively small sample sizes and the lack of skeletal material that cross-cuts all social and economic groups within each time period."

Zakrzewski in 2006 examined the biological diversity found within a series of Predynastic skeletal populations from Middle and Upper Egypt. She found a significant change in the length of the distal limb segments through the Predynastic into the Early Dynastic period. She concluded that early Egyptian populations were not a homogeneous entity, but consisted of local groups with reasonably distinct identities. She also concluded that the State formation process was not an entirely indigenous development, but rather that other groups from elsewhere along the Egyptian Nile Valley as well as from other nearby regions also inter-married with the original Egyptian population.

Barry Kemp (2007) surveyed the pre-dynastic populations of northern Egypt, Palestine to the north and Sudan to the south. He stated that "the limb-length proportions of males from Egyptians sites group them with Africans rather than Europeans".

A 2008 study compared ancient Egyptian osteology to that of African-Americans and White Americans, and found that "although ancient Egyptians are closer in body proportion to modern American Blacks than they are to American Whites, proportions in Blacks and Egyptians are not identical." Also, the samples featured in the study originated and "were measured predominantely in Giza".

Gallagher et al. (2009) also points out that "body proportions are under strong climatic selection and evidence remarkable stability within regional lineages".

Raxter (2011) noted that "Ancient Egyptians as a whole generally exhibit intermediate body breadths relative to higher and lower latitude populations, with Lower Egyptians possessing wider body breadths, as well as lower brachial and crural indices, compared to Upper Egyptians and Upper Nubians. This may suggest that Egyptians are closely related to circum-Mediterranean and/or Near Eastern groups, but quickly developed limb length proportions more suited to their present very hot environments. These results may also reflect the greater plasticity of limb length compared to body breadth." Nonetheless, Raxter acknowledges that although the study has larger samples than previous reports, it could have benefited from more data from particular periods and sites. "Larger samples from both Early and Late Predynastic groups would allow a closer examination of biological changes in the transition to agriculture."

A 2014 study by Bleuze et al examined skeletal samples from a Kellis 2 cemetery which was "occupied during the Late Ptolemaic through Roman periods" and found the "brachial and crucial indices" of the Kellis 2 samples were not significantly different from the Egyptian, Upper Nubians and Lower Nubian samples. Although, the authors cautioned that "the high intralimb indices and greater body mass relative to stature in the Kellis 2 sample suggest that generalized terms to categorize Egyptians, such as “tropical,” “Negroid,” and “super-Negroid” may be grossly inaccurate, and may additionally obscure localized adaptations within larger geographical areas."

Dental morphology
Modern studies on ancient Egyptian dentition clusters the Ancient Egyptians with Caucasoids (Europeans and Western Eurasians) who have small teeth, as opposed to Negroids (Western Sub-Saharan Africans) who have megadont/large teeth. However, other dental studies have shown close relationship between ancient Badari and Naqada populations, and suggested continuity throughout the Dynastic period, with Egyptian samples being more closely related to Northern Africa rather than to Europe or the Middle East.

Joel Irish (1998) examined 32 Sub-Saharan and North African dental samples dating from the late Upper Pleistocene to modern times. He found that North Africans are similar to Europeans and western Asians to some degree, whereas Sub-Saharan-affiliated Africans are very different to all others. A separate 1998 paper by the same author, based on numerically-derived affinities using the multivariate Mean Measure of Divergence statistic, reported that Sub-Saharan samples were significantly different to samples from North Africa, Europe and elsewhere. A 2006 bioarchaeological study on the dental morphology of ancient Egyptians in Upper Egypt by Joel Irish found that their dental traits were most similar to those of other Nile Valley populations, with more remote ties with Bronze Age to Christian period Nubians (e.g. A-Group, C-Group, Kerma) and other Afro-Asiatic speaking populations in Northeast Africa (Tigrean). Moreover, the Egyptian groups were generally distinct from the sampled West and Central African populations. Among the samples included in the study is skeletal material from the Hawara tombs of Fayum, (from the Roman period) which clustered very closely with the Badarian series of the predynastic period. All the samples, particularly those of the Dynastic period, were significantly divergent from a neolithic West Saharan sample from Lower Nubia. Biological continuity was also found intact from the dynastic to the post-pharaonic periods. Irish (2008) conducted a morphological comparison between the dental traits of human remains from Lower Nubian Neolithic sites at Gebel Ramlah (modern Southern Egypt) and Upper Nubian Neolithic sites from the cemeteries at R12 (modern Northern Sudan). Irish compared these remains to pooled dental samples from post-Neolithic Egyptians and Nubians to determine and distinguish biological affiliatations in the regional context. He concluded that the Lower Nubian samples of Gebel Ramlah and the Upper Nubian samples of R12 were not closely related biologically, whereas the post-Neolithic Egyptians and Nubians were closely related based on the Mean Measure of Divergence statistical analysis of 36 dental traits from the samples. This apparent homogeneity was attributed to population interaction stemming from a combination of trade, migration and genetic exchange along the River Nile, whereas the earlier Neolithic groups were more isolated from each other, both spatially and genetically.

Biological anthropologist Shomarka Keita takes issue with the suggestion of Irish that Egyptians and Nubians were not primary descendants of the African epipaleolithic and Neolithic populations. Keita also criticizes him for ignoring the possibility that the dentition of the ancient Egyptians could have been caused by "in situ microevolution" driven by dietary change, rather than by racial admixture.

Eric Crubezy's team showed that Predynastic cemetery in Adaima in Upper Egypt showed "Khoisan" dental markers (formally referred to as "Bushmen canine")

In 2023, Christopher Ehret reported that the physical anthropological findings from the “major burial sites of those founding locales of ancient Egypt in the fourth millennium BCE, notably El-Badari as well as Naqada, show no demographic indebtedness to the Levant”. Ehret specified that these studies revealed cranial and dental affinities with "closest parallels" to other longtime populations in the surrounding areas of northeastern Africa “such as Nubia and the northern  Horn of Africa”. He further commented that the Naqada and Badarian populations did not migrate “from somewhere else but were descendants of the long-term inhabitants of these portions of Africa going back many millennia”.

Language element

The Ancient Egyptian language is classified into six major chronological divisions: Archaic Egyptian, Old Egyptian, Middle Egyptian, Late Egyptian, Demotic Egyptian and Coptic. The last was used as a working language until the 18th century CE. It is still used today as a liturgical language by Egyptian Copts.

Origins
The Ancient Egyptian language has been classified as a member of the Afroasiatic language family. Of the other Afroasiatic branches, linguists have variously suggested that the Egyptian language shares its greatest affinities with neighbouring Berber and Semitic languages, particularly Hebrew. However, other scholars have argued the Ancient Egyptian language likewise shared linguistic ties with north-eastern African regions. Christopher Ehret describes the oldest speakers of the Afro-Asiatic language family as "a set of peoples whose lands between 15,000 and 13,000 BCE stretched from Nubia in the west to far northern Somalia in the east." Robert Morkot inferred that "Ancient Egyptian belongs to a language group known as 'Afro-Asiatic' (formerly called Hamito-Semitic) and its closest relatives are other north-east African languages from Somalia to Chad". Russell Schuh, in an article criticizing the Hamitic theory and Cheikh Anta Diop's attempt to link the Wolof language with Egyptian, argues that other Afrasian languages also share features with Egyptian, such as the Chadic languages of west and central Africa, the Cushitic languages of northeast Africa, and the Ethio-Semitic languages, which are found in Ethiopia and Eritrea. There is no agreement on when and where these languages originated, though the language is generally believed to have originated somewhere in or near the region stretching from the Levant in the Near East to northern Kenya, and from the Eastern Sahara in North Africa to the Red Sea, or Southern Arabia, Ethiopia and Sudan. There are however many scholars who accept an African phylum language origin since five of the six Afro-Asiatic subfamilies are spoken on the African continent, and only one in Asia. The languages of the neighbouring Nubian people belong to the Nilo-Saharan language family, and thus not an Afroasiatic language. However, the Cushitic language which is a sub-branch of the Afro-asiatic language family was spoken in Lower Nubia, an ancient region which extends from Upper Egypt to Northern Sudan, before the arrival of North Eastern Sudanic languages in the Middle Nile Valley.

See also
Demographics of Egypt
Genetic history of North Africa
Genetic history of the Middle East
Ancient Egyptian race controversy

References

External links
 About the demographics of ancient Egypt

Egypt
Demographics of Egypt
Social history of Egypt